César Augusto Oliveira de Almeida (born 6 January 1989) is a Brazilian handball goalkeeper for BM Granollers and the Brazilian national team.

He won a gold medal at the 2015 Pan American Games and competed at the 2016 Summer Olympics and at the 2013 and 2015 world championships.

On 23 May 2016, Almeida signed for the Norwegian club ØIF Arendal.

References

External links

1989 births
Living people
Handball players from São Paulo
Brazilian male handball players
Pan American Games medalists in handball
Pan American Games gold medalists for Brazil
Pan American Games bronze medalists for Brazil
Handball players at the 2015 Pan American Games
Handball players at the 2019 Pan American Games
Handball players at the 2016 Summer Olympics
Olympic handball players of Brazil
Brazilian expatriate sportspeople in Spain
Brazilian expatriate sportspeople in Norway
Liga ASOBAL players
Expatriate handball players
BM Granollers players
South American Games gold medalists for Brazil
South American Games medalists in handball
Competitors at the 2014 South American Games
Competitors at the 2018 South American Games
Medalists at the 2015 Pan American Games
Medalists at the 2019 Pan American Games
20th-century Brazilian people
21st-century Brazilian people